Face the Promise is the sixteenth studio album by the American rock musician Bob Seger. The album was originally planned to be released in 2004, was delayed to 2005, and was officially released on September 12, 2006. It is his first new studio album since It's a Mystery in 1995 and is Seger's first studio album not to be credited to "Bob Seger and the Silver Bullet Band" since Beautiful Loser in 1975. It took Seger six years to finish Face The Promise. The first single, "Wait For Me", was premiered in July 2006.

The album was certified platinum in the United States.

Track listing

Personnel
 Bernie Barlow - backing vocals
 Eddie Bayers - drums
 Bekka Bramlett - backing vocals
 Steve Brewster - drums
 David Cole - percussion
 J. T. Corenflos - electric guitar, acoustic guitar
 Laura Creamer - backing vocals
 Eric Darken - tambourine
 Kenny Greenberg - electric guitar
 Aubrey Haynie - fiddle
 Steve Herman - trumpet
 Jim Hoke - tenor saxophone
 William Huber - trombone
 John Jarvis - piano
 Kid Rock - guitar
 Randy Leago - tenor saxophone 
 Paul Leim - drums, cowbell
 Sam Levine - baritone saxophone
 Patty Loveless - vocals
 Gordon Mote - piano
 Shaun Murphy - backing vocals
 Steve Nathan - piano
 Larry Paxton - bass
 Bill Payne - piano
 Michael Rhodes - bass
 Brent Rowan - electric guitar
 Biff Watson - electric guitar 
 Glenn Worf - bass
 Marlin Young - electric guitar
 Bob Seger - vocals, synthesizer, percussion, electric guitar, acoustic guitar
Strings
 David Angell
 Zeneba Bowers
 John Catchings
 David Davidson
 Conni Ellisor
 Carl Gorodetzky
 Jim Grosjean
 Craig Nelson
 Carole Rabinowitz
 Pamela Sixfin
 Elisabeth Small
 Gary Vanosdale
 Mary Kathryn Vanosdale
 Matthew Walker

Production
Produced by Bob Seger, except "Real Mean Bottle" produced by Bob Seger and Kid Rock

Recorded by David N. Cole

Mixed by David N. Cole and Bob Seger

Recorded at Ocean Way Studios in Nashville except "Won't Stop" and "The Long Goodbye" recorded at Home Studios, Michigan

Certifications

Chart performance

Weekly charts

Year-end charts

Singles

References

Bob Seger albums
2006 albums
Capitol Records albums